Orao, "eagle" in Serbo-Croatian, may refer to:
Soko J-22 Orao, a Yugoslav-Romanian combat aircraft
The Yugoslav Orao-class minelayers 
Orao (computer)
The Kurukh people, also called Oṛāōn

Serbo-Croatian words and phrases